Christopher Joseph Gedney (August 9, 1970 – March 9, 2018) was an American college and professional football player who was a tight end in the National Football League (NFL) for six seasons. He played college football for Syracuse University, and earned All-American honors.  He played professionally for the Chicago Bears and Arizona Cardinals of the NFL. After his football career ended, he served as assistant athletics director at Syracuse University.

Early years
Gedney was born in Wilmington, Delaware. He graduated from Liverpool High School, where he played high school football for the Liverpool Warriors.

College career
While attending Syracuse University, he played for the Syracuse Orange football team from 1989 to 1992. As a senior in 1992, he was recognized as a consensus first-team All-American.

Professional career

His most productive season came in 1997, where he caught 23 passes for 261 yards and 4 touchdowns.

Life after football

Gedney lived in Syracuse, New York. He previously worked as the Development Liaison for the Syracuse Football Lettermen's Club and was an analyst for the Syracuse Sports Network.

On April 29, 2010, Gedney was promoted to Senior Associate Athletic Director for Major Gifts at Syracuse University.

Death
Gedney died by suicide on March 9, 2018, by gunshot to the neck aged 47. A brain autopsy performed by the Boston University CTE Center and Brain Bank determined that Gedney had had stage II chronic traumatic encephalopathy.

References

1970 births
2018 deaths
2018 suicides
People from Liverpool, New York
All-American college football players
American football tight ends
Arizona Cardinals players
Chicago Bears players
Syracuse Orange football players
Players of American football from New York (state)
Players of American football from Wilmington, Delaware
Suicides by firearm in New York (state)
American football players with chronic traumatic encephalopathy
Ed Block Courage Award recipients
Liverpool High School alumni